Stokes Township may refer to:

Stokes Township, Itasca County, Minnesota
Stokes Township, Roseau County, Minnesota
Stokes Township, Logan County, Ohio
Stokes Township, Madison County, Ohio

See also
Stokes (disambiguation)

Township name disambiguation pages